Leonardo Rubén Astrada (born 6 January 1970) is a retired Argentine footballer, who went on to become a football manager. The last team he managed was Atlético de Rafaela.

Playing career
Astrada was born in Buenos Aires. He played the majority of his career for River Plate, winning ten major titles – making him the second most decorated player in the club's history (after Leonardo Ponzio). He played a total of 405 games for the club in all competitions.

He also played for Brazilian club Grêmio in the year 2000.

In addition, he played for the Argentina national football team and was a participant at the 1998 FIFA World Cup. He made 32 appearances for Argentina scoring 1 goal.

Managerial career
After retirement in January 2004, he was appointed as manager for River Plate, and lasted one and a half years in the job.

In October 2005 he became the manager of Rosario Central, but He didn't have a good relationship with the board, and quickly quit his position. During the 2007–08 season he coached Colón but left his position in March 2008.

After an unsuccessful stint with Estudiantes de La Plata between 2008 and on 6 October 2009 River Plate officials have hired the coach to replace Néstor Gorosito, who recently quit after the 1–2 defeat against San Lorenzo. Astrada already managed River in the 2004–2005 season.
In 2015, Astrada signed a contract with Atlético de Rafaela until the end of the season in the Argentinian first division.

Honours

Player
River Plate
Argentine Primera División (10): 1989–90, 1991 Apertura, 1993 Apertura, 1994 Apertura, 1996 Apertura, 1997 Clausura, 1997 Apertura, 1999 Apertura, 2002 Clausura, 2003 Clausura
Copa Libertadores (1): 1996
Supercopa Sudamericana (1): 1997

Argentina
Copa América (1): 1991

Manager
River Plate
Argentine Primera División (1): 2004 Clausura

References

External links

Living people
1970 births
Footballers from Buenos Aires
Association football midfielders
Argentine footballers
Club Atlético River Plate footballers
Grêmio Foot-Ball Porto Alegrense players
1998 FIFA World Cup players
1991 Copa América players
1995 Copa América players
Argentina international footballers
Expatriate footballers in Brazil
Argentine football managers
Club Atlético River Plate managers
Rosario Central managers
Club Atlético Colón managers
Estudiantes de La Plata managers
Cerro Porteño managers
Argentinos Juniors managers
Atlético de Rafaela managers
Argentine expatriate footballers
Argentine Primera División players
Argentine expatriate sportspeople in Brazil
Copa América-winning players
Expatriate football managers in Paraguay
Argentine expatriate sportspeople in Paraguay